Almere Poort is a railway station in Almere, Netherlands. It is located on the Flevolijn. It replaced Almere Strand railway station as the city's sixth railway station.

The opening of the station, initially planned for 2007, took place on 9 December 2012. The station serves the new borough Almere Poort which is also under development since 2007 and will have 11,000 dwellings when it is finished.

Train services
, the following train services call at this station:
Local Sprinter services Hoofddorp - Schiphol Airport - Amsterdam Zuid - Almere Oostvaarders
Local Sprinter services The Hague - Schiphol Airport - Amsterdam - Weesp - Almere - Lelystad - Zwolle
Local Sprinter services Utrecht - Hilversum - Almere

Bus services
2 (Station Poort - Gooisekant - Topsporthal - Stedenwijk - Almere Centrum)
4 (Station Poort - Homeruskwartier - Literatuurwijk - Muziekwijk - Almere Centrum)
10 (Station Poort - Gooisekant - Busstation 't Oor - Danswijk - Almere Buiten - Oostvaardersdiep)
14 (Station Poort - Literatuurwijk - Muziekwijk - Almere Centrum)
153 (Amsterdam Holendrecht/AMC - Bijlmer ArenA - Muiden P&R - Almere Poort - Literatuurwijk - Kruidenwijk - Waterwijk - Almere Buiten)
322 (Amsterdam Amstel - Muiden P&R - Almere Poort - Gooisekant - Almere Parkwijk)

References

External links
NS website 
Dutch Public Transport journey planner 

Poort
Railway stations opened in 2012
Railway stations on the Flevolijn